The Swiss Mixed Curling Championship is the national championship of mixed curling (two men and two women) in Switzerland. It has been held annually since 1976 and organized by Swiss Curling Association.

In mixed curling, the positions on a team must alternate between men and women. If a man throws last rocks, which is usually the case, the women must throw lead rocks and third rocks, while the other male member of the team throws second rocks.

List of champions and medallists
The past champions and medalists of the event are listed as follows (in order - fourth/skip, third, second, lead, alternate; skips marked bold):

References

External links
Resultate Archiv Elite - swisscurling
Swiss Curling Association Champions
Erfolge des Curling Club Dübendorf

See also
Swiss Men's Curling Championship
Swiss Women's Curling Championship
Swiss Mixed Doubles Curling Championship
Swiss Junior Curling Championships
Swiss Senior Curling Championships
Swiss Wheelchair Curling Championship

Curling competitions in Switzerland
Recurring sporting events established in 1976
1976 establishments in Switzerland
National curling championships
Mixed curling
Annual sporting events in Switzerland